General Snyder may refer to:

Donald Snyder (general) (born 1936), U.S. Air Force lieutenant general
Howard McCrum Snyder (1881–1970), U.S. Army major general
Oscar P. Snyder (1895–1983), U.S. Army major general

See also
General Schneider (disambiguation)